The 1967 All-Atlantic Coast Conference football team consists of American football players chosen by various selectors for their All-Atlantic Coast Conference ("ACC") teams for the 1967 NCAA University Division football season. Selectors in 1967 included the Associated Press (AP).

All-Atlantic Coast Conference selections

Offensive selections

Ends
 Harry Martell, NC State (AP)
 Rick Decker, Wake Forest (AP)

Offensive tackles
 Wayne Mass, Clemson (AP)
 Greg Shelly, Virginia (AP)

Offensive guards
 Harry Olszewski, Clemson (AP)
 Norman Cates, NC State (AP)

Centers
 Mike Murphy, Duke (AP)

Backs
 Buddy Gore, Clemson (AP)
 Frank Quayle, Virginia (AP)
 Wayne Muir, South Carolina (AP)
 Freddie Summers, Wake Forest (AP)

Defensive selections

Defensive ends
 Mark Capuano, NC State (AP)
 Ronnie Duckworth, Clemson (AP)

Defensive tackles
 Dennis Byrd, NC State (AP)
 Don Somma, South Carolina (AP)

Middle guards
 Bob Foyle, Duke (AP)

Linebackers
 Jimmy Catoe, Clemson (AP)
 Tim Bice, South Carolina (AP)

Defensive backs
 Freddie Combs, NC State (AP)
 Andy Beath, Duke (AP)
 Frank Liberatore, Clemson (AP)
 Jack Davenport, North Carolina (AP)

Special teams

Kickers
 Gerald Warren, NC State (AP)

Key
AP = Associated Press

See also
1967 College Football All-America Team

References

All-Atlantic Coast Conference football team
All-Atlantic Coast Conference football teams